Lachenal & Co. was a British firm producing concertinas from approximately 1850–1936. The firm was founded by Louis L. Lachenal (c. 1821–1861), a Swiss emigrant to the United Kingdom, who arrived there in 1839, and by 1844 was working in support of the famous Wheatstone concertina firm before founding a supporting contract firm and by 1858, an independent firm.

Lachenal's innovations in concertina production led his company to become one of the most prolific concertina producers of the era.

See also
 Marie Lachenal, concertinist and daughter of Louis Lachenal

References

Concertina makers
Musical instrument manufacturing companies of the United Kingdom
1850 establishments in the United Kingdom
British companies established in 1850
Manufacturing companies established in 1850